Marmat is a village in Mazandaran Province, Iran.

Marmat may also refer to:

Marmat (tehsil), a village and tehsil in Doda district of Jammu and Kashmir, India

See also
Marmato, a 2014 American documentary film